Aprominta argonauta is a moth of the family Autostichidae. It is found on Crete.

References

Moths described in 1964
Aprominta
Moths of Europe